Erin Suzanne Houchin (née Mount; born September 24, 1976) is an American politician serving as the U.S. representative for  since 2023. A member of the Republican Party, she represented the 47th district in the Indiana Senate from 2014 to 2022.

Early life and education 
Houchin is a native of Scottsburg, Indiana. She earned a Bachelor of Arts in psychology from Indiana University Bloomington and a Master of Arts in political management from George Washington University.

Early political career 
Houchin worked as a field manager for U.S. Senator Dan Coats. She was first elected to the Indiana Senate in 2014, defeating incumbent Richard D. Young.

U.S House of Representatives

2022 election 

On January 13, 2022, a day after Hollingsworth announced he would not run for reelection, Houchin announced that she was running to succeed him in the 2022 elections. On January 29, 2022, Houchin announced that she was resigning from the state senate on February 4 to focus on her bid for Congress. She won the Republican primary and the November 8 general election.

Caucus memberships 
 Republican Main Street Partnership

Personal life
Houchin's husband, Dustin, is a prosecutor for Washington County, Indiana. They have three children. Dustin ran for a judgeship on the Washington County Superior Court in 2022. Houchin is Protestant and attends Mount Tabor Chiristian church, a Restorationist church.

References

External links
Congresswoman Erin Houchin official U.S. House website
 Erin Houchin for Congress
 
 

|-

|-

1976 births
21st-century American politicians
21st-century American women politicians
American Protestants
Christians from Indiana
Female members of the United States House of Representatives
Living people
People from Salem, Indiana
Protestants from Indiana
Republican Party Indiana state senators
Republican Party members of the United States House of Representatives from Indiana
The Graduate School of Political Management alumni
Women state legislators in Indiana